Archibald William Roach  (8 January 1956 – 30 July 2022) was an Australian singer, songwriter and Aboriginal activist. Often referred to as "Uncle Archie", Roach was a Gunditjmara and Bundjalung elder who campaigned for the rights of Aboriginal and Torres Strait Islander people. His wife and musical partner was the singer Ruby Hunter (1955–2010).

Roach first became known for the song "Took the Children Away", which featured on his debut solo album, Charcoal Lane, in 1990. He toured around the globe, headlining and opening shows for Joan Armatrading, Bob Dylan, Billy Bragg, Tracy Chapman, Suzanne Vega and Patti Smith. His work has been recognised by numerous nominations and awards, including a Deadly Award for a "Lifetime Contribution to Healing the Stolen Generations" in 2013. At the 2020 ARIA Music Awards on 25 November 2020, Roach was inducted into their hall of fame. His 2019 memoir and accompanying album were called Tell Me Why.

Early life
Archibald William Roach was born on 8 January 1956 in Mooroopna, Victoria. Mooroopna is named after an Aboriginal word referring to a bend in the Goulburn River near Shepparton in central Victoria. Roach was of Gunditjmara (Kirrae Whurrong / Djab Wurrung) and Bundjalung heritage.

In 1956, Roach's family, along with the remaining Aboriginal population at Cummeragunja, were rehoused at Rumbalara. The family subsequently moved to Framlingham, where his mother had been born.

At the age of two or three, Roach and his sisters and brothers, along with the other Indigenous Australian children of the Stolen Generations, were forcibly removed from their family by government agencies and placed in an orphanage. After two unpleasant placements in foster care, Roach was eventually fostered by Alex and Dulcie Cox, a family of Scottish immigrants in Melbourne. Their eldest daughter Mary Cox would sing church hymns and taught Roach the basics of guitar and keyboards. Roach's love of music was further fuelled by Alex's collection of Scottish music. "He was a big influence on me — a good influence. I'll love him to the day I die."

At fifteen, Roach was contacted by his natural sister Myrtle, who told him their mother had just died. He spent the next fourteen years on the streets, battling alcoholism. Roach met his future wife, Ruby Hunter, at a Salvation Army drop-in centre known as the People's Palace in Adelaide when she was sixteen.

Career
Roach's career spanned three decades, during which he toured extensively, headlining and opening shows for singers such as Joan Armatrading, Bob Dylan, Billy Bragg, Tracy Chapman, Suzanne Vega and Patti Smith.

1989–2000: Charcoal Lane, Jamu Dreaming and Looking for Butter Boy

In the late 1980s, Roach and Hunter formed a band, the Altogethers, with several other Indigenous Australians and moved to Melbourne. At the urging of Henry "Uncle Banjo" Clark, Roach wrote his first song, "Took the Children Away", which he performed on a community radio station in Melbourne and on an Indigenous current affairs program in 1988. Australian musician Paul Kelly invited Roach to open his concert early in 1989, where he performed "Took the Children Away", a song telling the story of the Stolen Generations and his own experience of being forcibly removed from his family. His performance was met with stunned silence, followed by shattering applause.

In 1990, with the encouragement of Kelly, Roach recorded his debut solo album, Charcoal Lane, which was released in May 1990. The album was certified gold and awarded two ARIA Awards at the 1991 ceremony. The album included "Took the Children Away" which became one of the most important songs in Australia's contemporary history. In 1990, Australia's Human Rights and Equal Opportunity Commission's awarded the song its first Human Rights Award for songwriting. Charcoal Lane featured in the top 50 albums for 1992 by Rolling Stone magazine.

In May 1993, Roach released his second studio album, Jamu Dreaming. The album was recorded with musical assistance from David Bridie, Tiddas, Paul Kelly, Vika and Linda Bull, Ruby Hunter, Dave Arden and Joe Geia. The album peaked at number 55 on the ARIA Charts.

In 1995, Roach toured extensively throughout the US, Canada, the UK and Europe. He returned to Australia to record the title track for ATSIC's Native Title CD, Our Home, Our Land, with Tiddas, Kev Carmody, Bart Willoughby, Shane Howard and Bunna Laurie. In 1996, Roach performed as part of a presentation to the Human Rights Commission's Inquiry into the Stolen Generations, before embarking on a national tour as a guest of Tracy Chapman.

In October 1997, Roach released his third studio album, Looking for Butter Boy, which was recorded on his traditional land at Port Fairy in south-western Victoria. The album's lead single, "Hold On Tight", won the ARIA Award for Best Indigenous Release in 1997 and the album won the same award and the Best Adult Contemporary Album at the 1998 award ceremony.

2001–2009: Sensual Being and Journey

In July 2002, Roach released his fourth studio album, Sensual Being, which peaked at number 59 on the ARIA charts. In 2002, he worked on the Rolf de Heer film The Tracker.

In 2004, Roach and Hunter collaborated with the Australian Art Orchestra (AAO) and Paul Grabowsky to create a concert titled Ruby's Story. Ruby tells the story of Ruby Hunter through music and the spoken word, from her birth near a billabong on the banks of the Murray River, through the stolen generation, search for identity and the discovery of hope through love. The production debuted at the Message Sticks Festival at the Sydney Opera House in June 2004, to good reviews. In 2004, the soundtrack, Ruby, won the Deadly Award for Excellence in Film & Theatrical Score, and the show went on to tour nationally and internationally until 2009. The soundtrack was released as an album on CD and as a digital download in 2005.

In October 2004 a new concert, once again a collaboration with Hunter, Grabowsky and the AAO, entitled Kura Tungar – Songs from the River, premiered at the Melbourne International Arts Festival, which was directed by Robyn Archer that year. The concert, which was directed by Patrick Nolan, told stories from the two performers' lives, and featured songs about the Murray River and Ngarrindjeri Country, Ruby's home. The music used Roach and Hunter's lyrics and chords combined with Grabowsky and the AAO's contemporary jazz orchestration. It played to full houses which gave standing ovations and was later performed at the Sydney Opera House and Adelaide Festival Centre. In 2005 Kura Tungar won the Helpmann Award for the Best Contemporary Australian Concert at the 5th Helpmann Awards.

In October 2007, Roach released Journey, an album of songs as a companion piece to a documentary film called Liyarn Ngarn, made with Roach, Patrick Dodson and Pete Postlethwaite.

In October 2009 at the Melbourne International Arts Festival, Roach performed in the world premiere of the musical theatre production of Dirtsong, created by Black Arm Band theatre company. The songs were written by Alexis Wright, with some sung in Indigenous languages. The show was reprised as the closing show at the 2014 Adelaide Festival. Other performers included Trevor Jamieson (2014 only), Lou Bennett, Emma Donovan, and Paul Dempsey.

In November 2009, ABC Music released previously unreleased Roach recordings from 1988 under the album title 1988.

2010–2016: Into the Bloodstream and Let Love Rule

In October 2012, Roach released Into the Bloodstream, an album he described as being built on pain following the death of his wife in February 2010. In 2013 he won a Deadly Award for Album of the Year for this album, as well as a "Lifetime Contribution to Healing the Stolen Generations".

In October 2013, Roach released Creation, a 4-CD box set of his first four studio albums. The album was released to coincide with the premiere of Roach's new live show, also entitled Creation, which debuted at the inaugural Boomerang Festival in Byron Bay from 4 to 6 October 2013.

At the APRA Music Awards of 2015 2015, Roach (and Shane Howard) won Best Original Song Composed for the Screen "The Secret River" from The Secret River.

In November 2015, Roach celebrated the 25th anniversary of Charcoal Lane with a deluxe remastered edition. The new edition included a second disc featuring previously unreleased Triple J – Live At The Wireless recordings and new interpretations of classic Charcoal Lane material by various artists. In November and December 2015, Roach undertook a national tour to celebrate the album's 25th anniversary.

In November 2016, Roach released his seventh studio album, Let Love Rule, which peaked at number 24 on the ARIA Charts, becoming his highest charting album to date.

2017–2022: The Concert Collection 2012–2018 and Tell Me Why
At the APRA Music Awards of 2017 in March 2017, Roach won the Ted Albert Award for Outstanding Services to Australian Music.

In April 2018, Roach performed at the Commonwealth Games closing ceremony on the Gold Coast with Amy Shark.

In May 2019, Roach released The Concert Collection 2012–2018 and in July 2019, was nominated for two awards at the 2019 National Indigenous Music Awards.

On 1 November 2019, Roach published a memoir entitled Tell Me Why: The Story of My Life and My Music, and released a companion album, Tell Me Why, on the same day. His book was shortlisted for the 2020 Victorian Premier's Prize for Nonfiction and won the 2020 Indie Book Non-Fiction Award. It also won the Audiobook of the Year at the 2021 Australian Book Industry Awards. The album's lead single "Open Up Your Eyes" is the first song Roach ever wrote, dating back to the late 1970s, but had not before been recorded. Tell Me Why became Roach's first top-ten album on the ARIA Charts.

Wash My Soul in the River's Flow (2021), written and directed by Philippa Bateman and produced by Bateman, Kate Hodges and Roach, is a feature-length documentary film based on the 2004 concert Kura Tungar-Songs from the River, featuring Roach, Hunter, Paul Grabowsky and the Australian Art Orchestra, in which Hunter and Roach sing about the Murray River and Ngarrindjeri lands. The film also tells of the love story between Hunter and Roach, and is interspersed with vision of The Coorong. The film had its world premiere at the Brisbane International Film Festival in October 2021 and was an official selection for the Sydney Film Festival and the Melbourne International Film Festival in December 2021.

In March 2022, Roach released his career-spanning anthology, titled My Songs: 1989–2021, which was subsequently nominated as the Album of the Year for the 2022 National Indigenous Music Awards two weeks before his death. At the 2022 ARIA Music Awards a special tribute in his honour will have Budjerah, Jessica Mauboy and Thelma Plum performing "One Song" from that album.

Activism
In 2013, shortly after receiving his Lifetime Deadly Award, Roach called on the recently elected prime minister, Tony Abbott, for an end to the Northern Territory Intervention.

Discography 

 Charcoal Lane (1990)
 Jamu Dreaming (1993)
 Looking for Butter Boy (1997)
 Sensual Being (2002)
 Journey (2007)
 Into the Bloodstream (2012)
 Let Love Rule (2016) 
 Dancing with My Spirit (2018)
 Tell Me Why (2019) 
 The Songs of Charcoal Lane (2020)

Personal life 

Roach was married to the singer Ruby Hunter (died 2010) who was also his musical partner. They had two sons, Amos and Eban. They also had three foster children, Kriss, Terrence and Arthur. 

On 14 October 2010, Roach suffered a stroke while working in the Kimberley region. After recuperating, he returned to live performance in April 2011. He also survived lung cancer, due to early diagnosis in 2011 and major surgery.

Death and legacy
Roach died on 30 July 2022 at Warrnambool Base Hospital. His sons, Amos and Eban, have given permission for his name and image to continue to be used "so that his legacy will continue to inspire". This permission is limited to news.  Tributes were paid to his memory by prominent names in arts, politics and sport including Australian prime minister Anthony Albanese, Victorian premier Daniel Andrews and musicians including Emma Donovan, Briggs, John Schumann, Alice Skye, Emily Wurramara, Paul Kelly, Billy Bragg, Mark Seymour, Midnight Oil and Shane Howard.

"Uncle Archie", as he was affectionately known to many, was regarded as giving a voice to the stories of many Aboriginal people and offering comfort and healing in his words and music. Euahlayi scholar Bhiamie Williamson, who wrote his PhD thesis on "Indigenous Men and Masculinities", describes the concept of the "Emu Man", based on the male emu, which is devoted to his family and chicks and sits on the eggs. Roach was considered a role model who represented an image shown too rarely in public discourse. Williamson writes:

Archie Roach Foundation

The Archie Roach Foundation was established in 2014 to nurture talent in young Aboriginal and Torres Strait Islander people and to offer them opportunities in the arts, to provide connection to culture and healing. , the board of directors included Roach, Uncle Jack Charles and four other people, with Charles and Rhoda Roberts as ambassadors of the foundation. The foundation has supported hundreds and inspired thousands more young people. His work in youth detention centres continues to affect those who listened to him.

Honours
 In 2011, Roach was one of the first people inducted to the Victorian Aboriginal Honour Roll.

 In 2015, Roach was honoured in the Queen's Birthday Honours list as a Member of the Order of Australia (AM) for services to music as a singer-songwriter, guitarist and a prominent supporter of social justice.

 In 2020, Roach was named the 2020 Victoria Australian of the Year.

In 2022, two side-by-side pillar-shaped monuments were erected on the shores of Lake Bonney at Barmera, in homage to Hunter and Roach. A glass mosaic artwork on the front side of each monument depict Hunter's Ngarrindjeri totem, the pelican and Roach's totem, the eagle, respectively.
In 2023, Roach was posthumously promoted to Companion of the Order of Australia (AC) for "eminent service to the performing arts as a songwriter and musician, to Indigenous rights and reconciliation, and through support for emerging First Nations artists".

Recognition and awards 
"Took the Children Away" was added to the National Film and Sound Archive's Sounds of Australia registry in 2013.

AIR Awards
The Australian Independent Record Awards (commonly known informally as AIR Awards) is an annual awards night to recognise, promote and celebrate the success of Australia's Independent Music sector.

|-
| rowspan="2" | AIR Awards of 2017
|Let Love Rule 
| Best Independent Blues and Roots Album
| 
|-

APRA Awards
The APRA Awards are held in Australia and New Zealand by the Australasian Performing Right Association to recognise songwriting skills, sales and airplay performance by its members annually. They commenced in 1982.

! 
|-
|rowspan="2"| 2017
| Archie Roach
| Ted Albert Award for Outstanding Services to Australian Music
| 
|
|-
| "It's Not Too late"
| Song of the Year
| 
| 
|-
| 2020
| "Open Up Your Eyes"
| Song of the Year
| 
|  
|-
| 2021 
| "Tell Me Why" (with Sally Dastey)
| Song of the Year
| 
| 
|-
| 2023
| "One Song"
| Song of the Year 
|  
| 
|-

ARIA Awards
Roach has received ten ARIA Music Awards from twenty-three nominations.

|-
| rowspan="4"| 1991 || rowspan="3"| Charcoal Lane || Best New Talent ||  
|-
| Best Indigenous Release ||  
|-
| Breakthrough Artist – Album ||  
|-
| "Took the Children Away" || Breakthrough Artist – Single ||  
|-
| 1992 || "Down City Streets" || Best Indigenous Release ||  
|-
| 1994 || Jamu Dreaming || Best Indigenous Release ||  
|-
| 1997 || "Hold On Tight" || Best Indigenous Release ||  
|-
| rowspan="2"| 1998 || rowspan="2"| Looking for Butter Boy || Best Indigenous Release ||  
|-
| Best Adult Contemporary Album ||  
|-
| rowspan="3"| 2002 || Sensual Being || Best Adult Contemporary Album ||  
|-
| Richard Pleasance & Paul Kelly for Sensual Being || Producer of the Year ||  
|-
| The Tracker || Best Original Soundtrack Album ||  
|-
| 2008 || Journey || Best World Music Album ||  
|-
| 2010 || 1988 || Best World Music Album ||  
|-
| 2013 || Into the Bloodstream || Best Blues & Roots Album ||  
|-
| 2017 || Let Love Rule || Best Blues & Roots Album ||  
|-
| rowspan="4"| 2020 || rowspan="3"| Tell Me Why || Best Male Artist ||  
|-
| Best Adult Contemporary Album ||  
|-
| Best Independent Release ||  
|-
| Archie Roach || Hall of Fame || 
|-
| rowspan="2"| 2021 || rowspan="2"| The Songs of Charcoal Lane || Best Blues & Roots Album || 
|-
| Best Independent Release ||  
|-
| 2022 || "One Song" || Best Independent Release ||  
|-

Australia Council for the Arts
The Australia Council for the Arts is an arts funding and advisory body for the Government of Australia. Since 1993 it has awarded a Red Ochre Award. It is presented to an outstanding Indigenous Australian (Aboriginal Australian or Torres Strait Islander) artist for lifetime achievement.

|-
| 2011
| himself
| Red Ochre Award
| 
|-

Deadly Awards
The Deadly Awards (commonly known simply as The Deadlys) was an annual celebration of Australian Aboriginal and Torres Strait Islander achievement in music, sport, entertainment and community. They ran from 1996 to 2013.

|-
| Deadly Awards 1997
| "himself"
| Male Artist of the Year
| 
|-
| Deadly Awards 1998
| "himself"
| Male Artist of the Year
| 
|-
| rowspan="2"| Deadly Awards 2002
| "himself"
| Male Artist of the Year
| 
|-
| Sensual Being
| Album of the Year
| 
|-
| Deadly Awards 2003
| "himself"
| Outstanding Contribution to Aboriginal and Torres Strait Islander Music
| 
|-
| Deadly Awards 2004
| Ruby 
| Excellence in Film & Theatrical Score
| 
|-
| Deadly Awards 2010
| 1988
| Album of the Year
| 
|-
| rowspan="2"| Deadly Awards 2013 
| Into the Bloodstream
| Album of the Year
| 
|-
| "himself"
| The Lifetime Contribution Award For Healing The Stolen Generations
| 
|-

Don Banks Music Award
The Don Banks Music Award was established in 1984 to publicly honour a senior artist of high distinction who has made an outstanding and sustained contribution to music in Australia. It was founded by the Australia Council in honour of Don Banks, Australian composer, performer and the first chair of its music board.

|-
| 2015
| Archie Roach
| Don Banks Music Award
| 
|-

Helpmann Awards
The Helpmann Awards is an awards show, celebrating live entertainment and performing arts in Australia, presented by industry group Live Performance Australia (LPA) since 2001. In 2018, Roach received the JC Williamson Award, the LPA's highest honour, for their life's work in live performance.

|-
| 2005 || Kura Tungar: Songs from the River  (with Ruby Hunter) || Best Australian Contemporary Concert || 
|-
| 2013 || Into the Bloodstream || Best Australian Contemporary Concert || 
|-
| 2018 || Himself || JC Williamson Award || 
|-

J Awards
The J Awards are an annual series of Australian music awards that were established by the Australian Broadcasting Corporation's youth-focused radio station Triple J. They commenced in 2005.

|-
| J Awards of 2020
| Archie Roach
| Double J Artist of the Year
| 
|-

Mo Awards
The Australian Entertainment Mo Awards (commonly known informally as the Mo Awards) were annual Australian entertainment industry awards. They recognised achievements in live entertainment in Australia from 1975 to 2016. Archie Roach won two awards in that time.
 (wins only)
|-
| 1991
| Archie Roach 
| Folk Performer of the Year
| 
|-
| 1992
| Archie Roach 
| Folk Performer of the Year
| 
|-

Music Victoria Awards
The Music Victoria Awards are an annual awards night celebrating Victorian music. 

|-
| rowspan="3"| 2013
| himself
| Best Indigenous Act
| 
|-
| himself
| Best Male Artist
| 
|-
| Into the Bloodstream
| Best Folk Roots Album
| 
|-
| 2015
| himself
| Hall of Fame
| 
|-
| 2017
| himself
| Best Indigenous Act
| 
|-

Sources:

National Dreamtime Awards
The National Dreamtime Awards are an annual celebration of Australian Aboriginal and Torres Strait Islander achievement in sport, arts, academia and community. They commenced in 2017.

|-
| 2018
| himself
| Achievement award
| 
|-

National Indigenous Music Awards
The National Indigenous Music Awards (NIMA) recognise excellence, dedication, innovation and outstanding contribution in the Northern Territory music industry. They commenced in 2004.

|-
| rowspan="5"| 2013
| "himself"
| Hall of Fame Inductee
| 
|-
| rowspan="2"| Into the Bloodstream
| Album of the Year
| 
|-
| Cover Art of the Year
| 
|-
| rowspan="2"| "Song to Sing"
| Film Clip of the Year
| 
|-
| Song of the Year
| 
|-
| 2018
| himself
| Artist of the Year
| 
|-
| rowspan="2"| 2019
| "himself"
| Artist of the Year
| 
|-
| The Concert Collection 2012–2018
| Album of the Year
| 
|-
| rowspan="2"| 2020
| "himself"
| Artist of the Year
| 
|-
| Tell Me Why
| Album of the Year
| 
|-
| 2022
| My Songs: 1989–2021
| Album of the Year
| 
|-

Sidney Myer Performing Arts Awards
The Sidney Myer Performing Arts Awards commenced in 1984 and recognise outstanding achievements in dance, drama, comedy, music, opera, circus and puppetry.

|-
| 2009 || Archie Roach (with Ruby Hunter) || Individual Award || 
|-

References

External links

Archie Roach: His life story told through his music at the National Film and Sound Archive
[ Archie Roach at allmusic.com]
 
 

1956 births
2022 deaths
Companions of the Order of Australia
APRA Award winners
ARIA Award winners
Australian guitarists
Australian male singers
Australian songwriters
Indigenous Australian musicians
Members of the Stolen Generations
Storytellers
People from Mooroopna
Mushroom Records artists
Australian male guitarists
Australian autobiographers
ARIA Hall of Fame inductees